Vyazovka is a rural locality (a village) in Podlubovsky Selsoviet, Karmaskalinsky District, Bashkortostan, Russia. The population was 53 as of 2010. There are 12 streets.

Geography 
Vyazovka is located 30 km northwest of Karmaskaly (the district's administrative centre) by road. Boriskino is the nearest rural locality.

References 

Rural localities in Karmaskalinsky District